James Marr may refer to:

 James Marr (biologist) (1902–1965), Scottish marine biologist and polar explorer
 James Marr (author) (1918–2009), historian of Guernsey

See also
James Maher (disambiguation)